In algebra, more specifically group theory, a p-elementary group is a direct product of a finite cyclic group of order relatively prime to p and a p-group. A finite group is an elementary group if it is p-elementary for some prime number p. An elementary group is nilpotent.

Brauer's theorem on induced characters states that a character on a finite group is a linear combination with integer coefficients of characters induced from elementary subgroups.

More generally, a finite group G is called a p-hyperelementary if it has the extension

where  is cyclic of order prime to p and P is a p-group. Not every hyperelementary group is elementary: for instance the non-abelian group of order 6 is 2-hyperelementary, but not 2-elementary.

See also
 Elementary abelian group

References
 Arthur Bartels, Wolfgang Lück, Induction Theorems and Isomorphism Conjectures for K- and L-Theory
 G. Segal, The representation-ring of a compact Lie group
 J.P. Serre, "Linear representations of finite groups". Graduate Texts in Mathematics, vol. 42, Springer-Verlag, New York, Heidelberg, Berlin, 1977,

Properties of groups